Carposina longipalpalis is a moth in the family Carposinidae. It was described by Wolfram Mey in 2007. It is found in Namibia.

References

Endemic fauna of Namibia
Carposinidae
Moths described in 2007
Moths of Africa